Hashim Al-Hashimi is a professional biochemist and professor of biochemistry and chemistry at Duke University. He received the prestigious NAS Award in Molecular Biology in 2020.

References

Year of birth missing (living people)
Living people
Duke University faculty
American biochemists
Yale University alumni